Eva Ódorová (born 22 November 1979 in Komárno) is a Slovak table tennis player.

Ódorová competed at the 2008 Summer Olympics, reaching the second round of the singles competition. She also competed in the team competition.

References 
 2008 Olympic Profile
 2016 Olympic Profile

1979 births
Living people
Sportspeople from Komárno
Slovak female table tennis players
Table tennis players at the 2008 Summer Olympics
Table tennis players at the 2016 Summer Olympics
Olympic table tennis players of Slovakia
European Games competitors for Slovakia
Table tennis players at the 2015 European Games